The Little River is a  tributary of Goosefare Bay in the U.S. state of Maine. It rises in Biddeford and flows southeast, becoming the boundary between Biddeford and Kennebunkport for the final  of its course. It empties into Goosefare Bay on the Atlantic Ocean at the east end of Kennebunkport's Goose Rocks Beach.

During part of the 19th century, a seasonal water-powered sawmill operated near what is now known as Timber Point.

See also
List of rivers of Maine

References

Maine Streamflow Data from the USGS
Maine Watershed Data From Environmental Protection Agency
 The Water-Power of Maine, Walter Wells, 1869, p. 193

Rivers of Maine
Rivers of York County, Maine